Colymbiformes is a disused order of birds that was once used to classify grebes and loons. Scientific study has revealed that these two types of waterbirds are not so closely related; they have been reclassified in the orders Podicipediformes and Gaviiformes, respectively.

References 
 "Colymbiformes". Encyclopædia Britannica. 2005. Encyclopædia Britannica Premium Service.

Bird orders
Obsolete bird taxa